Melieria omissa is a small fly that is commonly found in wet, marshy vegetation in May. Scientists think that the dagger-like ovipositor of the females might be used for inserting eggs into vegetation.

Distribution
M. omissa has been documented across Eurasia, from Great Britain to Korea, and as far south as Italy, Greece and the Arabian peninsula.

References

omissa
Insects described in 1826